Japanese people in Sri Lanka are people of Japanese ancestry living in Sri Lanka.

Demographics 

There were appropriately 778 of them as of August 2005. As of October 2017, there are approximately 767 of them.

See also
 Japan – Sri Lanka relations
 Japanese School in Colombo

References

Further reading
 Dancing for ancestral souls: Daily News (Sri Lanka)
 ‘Kouchi’: Authentic Japanese (Sunday Times)
 Japanese Graduate's Alumini Association of Sri Lanka (JAGAAS): Study in Japan 
 The Sunday Leader 

Sri Lanka
Japanese diaspora in Asia
Asian diaspora in Sri Lanka
Japan–Sri Lanka relations